The former Land Register in Amsterdam is a well-known building situated on the Prins Hendrikkade in the center of Amsterdam, opposite of the Amsterdam Central Railway Station.

The former land register building and the Lloyd Building on the Oostelijke Handelskade in Amsterdam are reminders of the Royal Dutch Lloyd in their name and details in interior and exterior. Opened in 1920, the building served first as headquarters of the Royal Dutch Lloyd shipping company. Later, the communal land register was situated in the building before moving, at which point the building was rented out for office space.

There are long-standing plans are to convert the building into a 4-star hotel. The hotel would have approximately 100 guest rooms; the basement area would be used for cultural and social activities.

Some oppose more hotel space in central Amsterdam, claiming there are enough hotels in the area. However, the hotel remains on track to be constructed, as no other tenants could be found for the building.

External links
Official Art'otel website
Park Plaza Media, Park Plaza Hotels Announce the Signing of a Key Covenant with the City of Amsterdam (The Nethlands), 3 July 2009
Hospitality Net, City of Amsterdam Signs Agreement with Park Plaza Hotels to Develop an art’otel in the City’s Iconic Former Kadaster Office, 6 July 2009
Sleepermagazine.com, Park Plaza to develop art’otel Amsterdam, 3 July 2009
Hotelsmagazine.com, Park Plaza Paves Way For art'otel Amsterdam, 6 July 2009

Buildings and structures in Amsterdam